William Sharp (born 13 May 1986) is a Nigerian rugby league footballer who plays as a  or on the  for the York City Knights in the Betfred Championship.

He has previously played for Harlequins RL and Hull FC in the Super League, and Featherstone Rovers and Halifax in the Championship.

Background
Sharp was born in Zaria, Nigeria.

Early career
He originally signed for London Broncos from South London Storm RLFC. He also played rugby union for Streatham-Croydon RFC.

Quins RL (now London Broncos) 
Sharp had a contract with Harlequins RL that saw the dynamic youngster join the first grade squad on a permanent basis.

Will Sharp was named as the Harlequins Senior Academy Player of the Year in 2007.

Hull FC
On 11 August 2010 it was announced that Will has signed a 2-year contract with Super League side Hull F.C. Upon signing Sharp was quoted as saying "I didn't want the opportunity to pass and wonder what if and I really want to test myself at Hull. When a club like Hull comes along with the potential to be a top three team it is hard to ignore."

Hull coach Richard Agar went on to say. "He is a talented, young and ambitious player. We're pleased he thinks Hull is the place to realise those ambitions. He has the ability to carry the ball well and has strength and speed which will be great assets for us next season and I don't think it will be long before he establishes himself as a crowd favourite at the KC Stadium." However, Agar dropped Sharp for the last game.

Under new Hull coach Peter Gentle, Sharp has looked much more confident when taking the ball forward and his defence has improved. Having Tony Martin, an experienced Super League and NRL player as his inside centre will no doubt help with his defence.

Featherstone Rovers
In April 2013 Will signed for ambitious Championship club Featherstone Rovers. He signed a 6-month deal in an effort to earn a longer contract. The then Rovers' coach Daryl Powell compared him to rugby league and rugby union footballer Jason Robinson. Sharp appeared to make an immediate impact with the fans due to his fearless and committed style of play. This earned him the nickname 'Sugar Ray'.

Halifax
Sharp joined Halifax ahead of the 2016 season.

He joined the club after being suggested by one time Featherstone Rovers' coach Peter Roe.

Representative
Sharp represented Cumbria in 2010.

In 2012 Will Sharp made his international début for the Nigerian national 7s team at the African Regional qualifiers in Morocco.

References

External links

Halifax profile
81416&includeref= dynamic Quins profile
 http://news.bbc.co.uk/sport1/hi/rugby_league/super_league/hull/8903938.stm

1986 births
Living people
Cumbria rugby league team players
Featherstone Rovers players
Halifax R.L.F.C. players
Hull F.C. players
London Broncos players
Nigerian emigrants to the United Kingdom
Nigerian rugby league players
Nigerian rugby union players
People from Zaria
Rugby league centres
Rugby league wingers
York City Knights players